Nastasia Nichitov-Ionescu (born 5 March 1954) is a Romanian sprint canoer who competed from the late 1970s to the early 1980s. Competing in two Summer Olympics, she won a gold medal in the K-4 500 m event at Los Angeles in 1984.

Ionescu also won six medals at the ICF Canoe Sprint World Championships with a silver (K-2 500 m: 1977) and five bronzes (K-2 500 m: 1978, 1979; K-4 500 m: 1978, 1979, 1983).

References

1954 births
Living people
Canoeists at the 1976 Summer Olympics
Canoeists at the 1984 Summer Olympics
Olympic canoeists of Romania
Olympic gold medalists for Romania
Romanian female canoeists
Olympic medalists in canoeing
ICF Canoe Sprint World Championships medalists in kayak
Medalists at the 1984 Summer Olympics